Udo Lindenberg (born 17 May 1946) is a German singer, drummer, and composer.

Career
Lindenberg started his musical career as a drummer. In 1969, he founded his first band Free Orbit, and also appeared as a studio and guest musician (with Michael Naura, Knut Kiesewetter). In 1970, he collaborated as a drummer with jazz saxophonist Klaus Doldinger in Munich. In 1971 Passport, a band founded by Doldinger, released its first album, with Lindenberg on drums. He also played drums for the theme music for the German TV series Tatort. The first LP by the jazz rock group Emergency was released in 1971, but met with little commercial success.

The LP Lindenberg (also 1971, sung in English, with Steffi Stephan on bass) was likewise unsuccessful. In the following year, the first LP in German was released: Daumen im Wind (produced by Lindenberg and Thomas Kukuck, who also co-produced Lindenberg's next five albums), featuring the single "Hoch im Norden", which became a radio hit in northern Germany. The year 1973 brought a breakthrough with the album Andrea Doria and the singles "Alles klar auf der Andrea Doria" and "Cello". With over 100,000 copies sold, Lindenberg quickly received the largest record deal of any German-language musician up to that time. Lindenberg was earning a special place in the new German-language music of the 1970s, finding a niche between internationally oriented Krautrock and mainstream pop music of the Schlager variety. German-language rock had previously been confined to predominantly political message bands whose music was directed at a narrow audience.

Lindenberg's brash style, everyday subject matter ("Bei Onkel Pö…") and his feel for language were an unprecedented combination in German-language music. His pioneering work helped other artists such as Stefan Waggershausen and Marius Müller-Westernhagen get record deals of their own. In 1973, Lindenberg first went on tour with his Panikorchester (Panic Orchestra).

1976 was one of Lindenberg's most productive years. Besides the LP Galaxo Gang, he also released a record under the name Das Waldemar Wunderbar Syndicat (I make you feel good), a first Best of Panik Udo and the first in a series of foreign-language releases, No Panic, on which Lindenberg translated his songs into English. In the same year (and on another LP: Sister King Kong) with the song "Rock 'n' Roll Arena in Jena", Lindenberg first mentioned a Panic Orchestra tour of the GDR. In 1976, Lindenberg discovered Ulla Meinecke and produced her first two albums. She was a guest artist and co-author of the 1977 LP Panische Nächte (Panic Nights) and the 1978 Dröhnland Symphonie. On Lindenbergs Rock Revue (1978), Lindenberg and  "Germanized" rock classics from Little Richard to The Beatles and The Rolling Stones, and went on a big tour. The number 1 hit "We Gotta Get out of This Place" was also released with German lyrics.

The subsequent Dröhnland-Symphonie-Tour was staged by Peter Zadek as a big multimedia stage show with a plethora of costumed extras. The result was Lindenberg's first live album Livehaftig. In 1979, Der Detektiv was the second Rock Revue, in which more international hits such as "Candle in the Wind" by Elton John, "Born to Be Wild" by Steppenwolf, "My Little Town" and "As Time Goes By" (from the film, Casablanca) were "Germanized". Also in 1997 was published "Belcanto - Udo Lindenberg & das Deutsche Filmorchester Babelsberg" which included hits like "Horizont", "Bis ans Ende der Welt" along with a song by Bertold Brecht and Lindenberg's own interpretation of "The Windmills of Your Mind" - "Under the drunkard moon" ("Unterm Säufermond") (lyrics: Lindenberg, Horst Königstein).

One of Lindenberg's most famous songs is "Sonderzug nach Pankow" (Special train service to Pankow), an adaptation of "Chattanooga Choo Choo", released as a single on 2 February 1983. It originated from the refusal of eastern German authorities to allow Lindenberg to perform in the GDR. On 25 October 1983, Lindenberg was finally allowed to perform for 15 minutes in the Palace of the Republic in East Berlin. In September 1987, he presented a custom Ibanez guitar to the then East German leader, Erich Honecker, during his visit to the West German city of Wuppertal.

On 3 June 2011, Lindenberg performed at Kampnagel unplugged. The recording was later released as an album within the MTV Unplugged series. Lindenberg was the eighth German artist in that series. The album became the second No. 1 album for Lindenberg, awarded platinum status for 200,000 units sold after two weeks. The second single from the album "Cello" (feat. Clueso) went to No. 4, giving Lindenberg the highest chart position in German singles charts ever.

Lindenberg has worked collaboratively with various local and international recording artists such as Eric Burdon, Helen Schneider, David Bowie, Tom Robinson, Keith Forsey, Gianna Nannini, Ellen ten Damme and Nena on a number of projects. He currently lives in Hamburg in the Hotel Atlantic (for several years now). His somewhat hoarse voice is the result of too much liquor and cigarettes. In 1989, he survived a heart attack. In 2010, he designed two postage stamps, based on his songs "Andrea Doria" and "Sonderzug nach Pankow", for the Deutsche Post.

For 2014, Lindenberg announced his first stadium tour in Germany.

From 1 February to 2 April 2015, an exhibition entitled "Porsche.Panic.Power" took place in the Porsche Museum in Zuffenhausen and showed numerous items from Lindenberg's private collection. Lindenberg opened the exhibition with a concert in the museum.

In 2023, "Komet", his track with rapper Apache 207, reached number one in the German charts.

Discography

Albums

D: Germany, A: Austria, CH: Switzerland

1 Udo Lindenberg & Panikorchester
2 Udo Lindenberg & Das Deutsche Filmorchester Babelsberg

Singles

D: Germany, A: Austria, CH: Switzerland

1Udo Lindenberg & Pascal
2Freundeskreis feat. Udo Lindenberg
3Nena & Friends (Udo Lindenberg, Sasha, Ben, ...)
4Udo Lindenberg feat. Inga Humpe
5Udo Lindenberg feat. Clueso
6Udo Lindenberg feat. Jan Delay

Literature 
 Bundesbeauftragter für die Stasi-Unterlagen: Udo rocks for world peace. The concert 1983 in the Stasi files. Berlin 2013. – free download of the documentation (108 pages) as pdf
 Holger Zürch: Panik pur 2. 40 Jahre Udo Lindenberg. 2007 bis 2011 – eine Bilanz. Selbstpublikation über Engelsdorfer Verlag, Leipzig 2012, .
 Bernd Kauffmann: Sonderzug nach Pankow. Theater der Zeit, Berlin 2011, .
 Thomas Freitag: Udo Lindenberg und der Osten. Neues Leben, Berlin 2011, 
 Herbert Schulze, Torsten Wahl: Udo Lindenberg „Wir wollen doch einfach nur zusammen sein“. Eine deutsch-deutsche Rockromanze. Mitteldeutscher Verlag, Halle (Saale) 2011, .
 Holger Zürch: Panik pur. 35 Jahre Udo Lindenberg – Die Bilanz. Mit einem Vorwort von Heinz Rudolf Kunze. Leipzig 2007,  sowie 2. Auflage als Taschenbuch-Ausgabe, Leipzig 2009, 
 Udo Lindenberg, Herbert Schnierle-Lutz (Hrsg.): Mein Hermann Hesse – Ein Lesebuch. Suhrkamp, Frankfurt am Main 2008, 
 Udo Lindenberg: Rock'n'Roll und Rebellion – Ein panisches Panorama. Mit einem Vorwort von Bazon Brock, EVA, Hamburg 2007,  – Erstausgabe mit LP 1981
 Benjamin von Stuckrad-Barre, Moritz von Uslar: Am Trallafiti-Tresen; Das Werk von Udo Lindenberg in seinen Texten. Europäische Verlagsanstalt, Hamburg 2008, .

References

External links

 Official website 
 "Udo Lindenberg & more" (art gallery)
 "Udo Lindenberg Art" (One of the largest collections of Udo Lindenberg artworks)
 
 

1946 births
Living people
German male musicians
German rock singers
German-language singers
Officers Crosses of the Order of Merit of the Federal Republic of Germany
Recipients of the Order of Merit of Berlin
Members of the Order of Merit of North Rhine-Westphalia
Male actors from Hamburg
Echo (music award) winners
People from Gronau, North Rhine-Westphalia